Gas Natural Building, also known as Mare Nostrum Tower, is an office skyscraper located in the La Barceloneta neighbourhood of the Ciutat Vella district in Barcelona, Spain.

It was the headquarters building of the Spanish company Naturgy, formerly known as Gas Natural, until 2019 when the company legal headquarters were moved to Madrid.

Description
The Gas Natural Building was designed by the architects Enric Miralles and Benedetta Tagliabue in the high-tech architectural style. It was completed in 2005,  and officially inaugurated in 2008.

It has 20 floors, and rises . It has an innovative and distinctive image, because the building has two lower horizontal glazed blocks protruding and cantilevered out from the main tower.

It is located near the seafront, and to the southwest of two other La Barceloneta skyscrapers, the Hotel Arts and the Torre Mapfre.

In 2019, Natury sold to Inmobiliaria Colonial the Mare Nostrum tower.

See also 
 List of tallest buildings and structures in Barcelona

References 

Skyscraper office buildings in Barcelona
Headquarters in Spain
Ciutat Vella
Office buildings completed in 2005
Towers completed in 2005
2005 establishments in Catalonia
2000s in Barcelona
Enric Miralles buildings
High-tech architecture
Modernist architecture in Barcelona